is a street performance festival and competition held annually in Shizuoka City, Japan each November.

History
The Daidogei World Cup first took place in 1992. Planning for the first event took three years, and the turnout of 1.5 million visitors exceeded the planners' expectations. From 2005, it expanded from a 3-day to a 4-day festival.

The 2020 event, scheduled to run from 31 October to 3 November, was cancelled due to the impact of the COVID-19 pandemic. This was the first time that the event had been cancelled.

Overview
Probably the biggest event on Shizuoka's calendar, the Daidogei World Cup is an annual international festival of buskers, held in November. Performers come from around the world and perform throughout the central part of the city as well as in some peripheral locations. It is a very popular event in Shizuoka, as well as among performers, and very competitive for performers to gain entry to the festival.

Administration
Daidogei is administered by the Daidogei World Cup Executive Committee, headquartered at Aiwa Building, in the Aoi Ward of Shizuoka City. It is executed by a staff of 2,800 people.

References

External links
  (Japanese)
  (English)

Annual events in Japan
Street performance
Shizuoka (city)